Red Hill is an unincorporated community and census-designated place (CDP) in Blair County, Pennsylvania, United States. It was first listed as a CDP prior to the 2020 census.

The CDP is in western Blair County, in the center of Logan Township. It is along Pennsylvania Route 36, which leads southeast  to Altoona and northwest up the Allegheny Front  to Ashville.

References 

Census-designated places in Blair County, Pennsylvania
Census-designated places in Pennsylvania